Amina Sankharé (born 4 May 1989) is a Senegalese handball player for Fleury Loiret HB and the Senegalese national team.

She competed at the 2019 World Women's Handball Championship in Japan.

References

External links

1989 births
Living people
Senegalese female handball players
Sportspeople from Aubervilliers
French sportspeople of Senegalese descent
Black French sportspeople
French female handball players